Alphabet Zoo is a series of ten-minute programmes for young children, produced by Granada Television and was broadcast on ITV for two series in 1983 and 1984. It was presented by singer Ralph McTell and actress Nerys Hughes. Each episode is dedicated to a letter of the alphabet.

The second series was directed by Lorne Magory (who also worked on several famous British programmes such as Press Gang, Life Force and Emmerdale)

Nearly a decade after Alphabet Zoo came to an end, the format was revived by ITV Carlton on the similarly named series Alphabet Castle which ran from September 1993 to December 1995.

The series was also transmitted on television in several countries worldwide such as TVNZ 1 (originally called TV One) and TVNZ 2 (originally called Network 2) in New Zealand, RTB in Brunei, GBC in Gibraltar, TV1 and TV2 in Malaysia and on BFBS and SSVC Television in Germany.

The original stories were in part written by Ann Yates.

Series guide
Series 1: 26 editions, 10 January 1983 – 25 July 1983
Series 2: 27 editions, 19 September 1983 – 2 April 1984 (Including one Christmas special)

1983 British television series debuts
1984 British television series endings
1980s British children's television series
British children's education television series
ITV children's television shows
Reading and literacy television series
Television series by ITV Studios
Television shows produced by Granada Television
English-language television shows
TVNZ 1 original programming